Sidney Herbert, 1st Baron Herbert of Lea, PC (16 September 1810 – 2 August 1861) was a British statesman and a close ally and confidant of Florence Nightingale.

Early life
He was the younger son of George Herbert, 11th Earl of Pembroke, his mother being the Russian noblewoman Countess Catherine Woronzow (or Vorontsov), daughter of the Russian ambassador to St James's, Semyon Romanovich Vorontsov. Woronzow Road in St John's Wood, London, is named after the family. Educated at Harrow and Oriel College, Oxford, he made a reputation at the Oxford Union as a speaker.

Career
Herbert entered the House of Commons as Conservative Member of Parliament for a division of Wiltshire in 1832. Under Robert Peel he held minor offices, and in 1845 was included in the cabinet as Secretary at War, and again held this office from 1852 to 1854, being responsible for the War Office during the Crimean War. He was yet again appointed Secretary at War in 1859, by which time the post had been combined with the office of Secretary of State for War.

Herbert was a member of the Canterbury Association from 20 March 1848.

He ran the Pembroke family estates, centred at Wilton House, Wiltshire, for most of his adult life. His elder half-brother, Robert Herbert, 12th Earl of Pembroke (1791–1862), had chosen to live in exile in Paris after a disastrous marriage in 1814 (annulled 1818) to a Sicilian princess (Ottavia Spinelli di Laurino, Princess of Butera).

Herbert asked his friend Florence Nightingale to lead a team of nurses out to Scutari during the Crimean War, and together he and Nightingale led the movement after the war for Army health and reform of the War Office. The hard work entailed caused a breakdown in his health, so that in July 1861, having been created a baron in the peerage of the United Kingdom, he had to resign government office.

Personal life

In the early 1840s, Herbert is thought to have had an affair with the noted society beauty and author Caroline Norton, who was unable to get a divorce from an abusive husband, so that the relationship ended in 1846.

In 1846 Herbert married Elizabeth (1822–1911), only daughter of Lt.-Gen. Charles Ashe à Court-Repington and niece of William à Court, 1st Baron Heytesbury. She was a philanthropist, author and translator, and a friend of Benjamin Disraeli, Cardinal Manning and Cardinal Vaughan. After her husband's death, Lady Herbert became an "ardent ultramontane" Roman Catholic, along with their eldest daughter, Mary.

Sidney and Elizabeth Herbert lived at 49 Belgrave Square, London, and had seven children:

Mary Catherine (1849–1935), who m. 1873 the great modernist theologian, Baron (Freiherr) Friedrich von Hügel.
George Robert Charles Herbert (1850–1895), who succeeded in the title and later became the 13th Earl of Pembroke, and the barony is now merged in that earldom.
Elizabeth Maud (1851–1933), who m. 1872 the composer, Sir Charles Hubert Parry, 1st Baronet (son of Thomas Gambier Parry), of Highnam Court, near Gloucester.
Sidney Herbert (1853–1913), also a Member of Parliament, who succeeded his brother as the 14th Earl of Pembroke.
William Reginald Herbert (1854–1870), lost at sea aboard HMS Captain, aged 16.
Michael Henry Herbert (The Hon. Sir Michael Herbert, KCMG, CB, PC) (1857–1904), after whom the town of Herbert in Saskatchewan, Canada, is named, was a diplomat who ended his career as British Ambassador to the US in Washington DC in succession to Lord Pauncefote. He m. 1888 Lelia "Belle", daughter of Richard Thornton Wilson, a New York banker and cotton broker, and had (with one other son) Sir Sidney Herbert, 1st Baronet.
Constance Gwladys (1859–1917), who m. 1st 1878 St George Henry Lowther, 4th Earl of Lonsdale (issue, 1 daughter) and m. 2ndly 1885 Frederick Oliver Robinson, the Earl de Grey, later 2nd and last Marquess of Ripon (no issue).

Death and memorials 

Herbert died from Bright's disease shortly after leaving government office, on 2 August 1861. He is buried in the churchyard at Wilton, rebuilt by his father in neo-Romanesque style, with inside the church a marble monumental effigy of him beside Elizabeth, his wife (who, however, was buried at St Joseph's Missionary College, Mill Hill, where she was a notable patron).

His statue by Foley was placed in front of the War Office in Pall Mall, London, and subsequently, following that building's demolition, placed next to A. G. Walker's statue of Florence Nightingale in Waterloo Place, adjacent to the Crimean Monument.

Another statue to him was erected in Victoria Park, Salisbury, Wiltshire. There is also a memorial to him on Inchkeith island in the Firth of Forth, which commemorates his advocacy for fortifying the island.

Herbert Sound in the Antarctic and Pembroke, Ontario in Canada are named after Sidney Herbert. In New Zealand, the highest peak on Banks Peninsula was named Mount Herbert by the chief surveyor of the Canterbury Association, Joseph Thomas, in 1849. The Otago surveyor's office renamed the town of Wanaka to Pembroke in 1863.

Notes

Sources
Sir Tresham Lever, The Herberts of Wilton (Murray, 1967)
Burke's Peerage, 107th edition
Mark Bostridge, Florence Nightingale. The Woman and Her Legend (Viking, 2008)

External links 

 
 

1810 births
1861 deaths
Sidney Herbert, 01st Baron Herbert of Lea
Herbert, Sidney
Secretaries of State for the Colonies
English people of Russian descent
Barons in the Peerage of the United Kingdom
People educated at Harrow School
Alumni of Oriel College, Oxford
Herbert, Sidney
Herbert, Sidney
Herbert, Sidney
Herbert, Sidney
Herbert, Sidney
Herbert, Sidney
Herbert, Sidney
Herbert, Sidney
UK MPs who were granted peerages
Younger sons of earls
Members of the Canterbury Association
Secretaries of State for War (UK)
Members of the Privy Council of the United Kingdom
Presidents of the Oxford Union
Peers of the United Kingdom created by Queen Victoria